Parliamentary elections were held in Norway between 5 and 27 August 1906, with a second round held between 26 August and 22 October. It was the first parliamentary election in Norway since the end of the union with Sweden a year earlier. A Two-round system was used at this election for the first time. The result was a victory for the Liberal Party, which won 73 of the 123 seats in the Storting.

Results

References

General elections in Norway
1900s elections in Norway
Norway
Parliamentary
Norway